Onofre Cândido Rosa S.D.B. (August 5, 1924 – December 9, 2009) was a Brazilian Catholic bishop of the Diocese of Jardim.

Ordained to the priesthood on December 7, 1957, Cândido Rosa named auxiliary bishop on January 9, 1970 and was ordained on March 19, 1970. After serving several Brazilian dioceses as bishop, he became bishop of the Jardim Diocese on February 11, 1982, retiring on August 4, 1999.

Notes

1924 births
2009 deaths
20th-century Roman Catholic bishops in Brazil
Roman Catholic bishops of Corumbá
Roman Catholic bishops of Jardim
Roman Catholic bishops of Uberlândia
Salesian bishops